Erik Walli-Walterholm (born 27 February 1999) is a Swedish professional ice hockey winger currently playing for Timrå IK in the Swedish Hockey League (SHL).

Playing career 
Walli-Walterholm made his SHL debut on 4 November 2017 in an away game against Färjestad BK. He was selected in the seventh round, 190th overall, of the 2017 NHL Entry Draft by the Arizona Coyotes.

Career statistics

References

External links

1999 births
Living people
Arizona Coyotes draft picks
Djurgårdens IF Hockey players
Ice hockey people from Stockholm
Swedish ice hockey forwards
Timrå IK players